"Take Pills" is the fourth and final single to be released by Panda Bear from his 2007 album Person Pitch. The 7″ single was released by Paw Tracks, in limited quantity of 1,000 copies.

While the title of this single may appear to be an advocation of recreational drug use, "Take Pills" explores both the musician's appreciation and personal struggles with antidepressants.

The B-side, entitled “Bonfire of the Vanities," is a non-album track, which was recorded in September 2004 at the Galeria Zé dos Bois in Portugal.

Track listing
 "Take Pills"
 "Bonfire of the Vanities"

References

2007 songs
Songs about drugs